Cagdanao is an island in the province of Palawan in the Philippines.

The island is surrounded with a coral reef, from shallow coral gardens to deep drop-offs on the north side. Cagdanao Island offers a variety of diving sites around the island. Hilly elevation with vegetation like palms, loamy and forest soil sandy.

Access to the island is mainly from Palawan, via a 40-minute sail with a speedboat. Cagdanao Island is a popular site for snorkeling and scuba diving in and around its coral reef. Damselfish (Pomacentridae), gobies (Gobiidae) and wrasses (Labridae) are the most abundant fish families.

A beach resort called Cagdanao Island Beach Resort is situated on the island.

See also
 List of islands of the Philippines

Islands of Palawan
Underwater diving sites in the Philippines